Christian Coste (born 23 February 1949 in Saint-Christol, Hérault) is a former professional  French footballer.

External links

 

1949 births
Living people
French footballers
France international footballers
Ligue 1 players
FC Sète 34 players
Lille OSC players
Stade de Reims players
Stade Lavallois players
French football managers
Paris Saint-Germain F.C. managers
FC Annecy managers
JS Kabylie managers
Association football forwards